The Basilica of St. Fidelis, commonly known as the Cathedral of the Plains, is a Romanesque-style Roman Catholic parish church in Victoria, Kansas, United States.  It was raised to the status of a Minor Basilica in 2014 and is also known as The Basilica of the Plains.  The twin towers are 141 feet tall.

History
The church was built between 1908 and 1911. The architect was John T. Comès of Pittsburgh with modifications and supervision by architect Joseph Marshall of Topeka. According to the church history, each member of the church who was 12 or older was asked to give $45, haul six wagon loads of Fencepost limestone and four loads of sand each year until the church was built. Some families brought as many as 70 to 80 wagonloads of stone.  The nickname The Cathedral of the Plains was bestowed upon the structure by former presidential candidate William Jennings Bryan after he visited the town in 1912.  Its 48 historic stained-glass windows were installed in 1916, by Munich Studios in Chicago, at a cost of $3,700, and are now valued at more than $1 million.  The church was added to the National Register in 1971.

In 1994, the church began a series of restoration efforts. The congregation spent more than $265,000 on weatherproofing the exterior, re-plastering and repainting the interior and updating the sound, electrical and heating systems.  Work also included installing a marble floor in the sanctuary for $60,000 and replacing old carpeting and linoleum floors in other areas.  The parish re-shingled the church roof in 2006 for $137,000.

In 2011, it replaced the parking lot and sidewalks for $225,000, and spent $70,000 on repairing the plaster ceilings and walls that had cracked with age.  In 2013, an Arkansas company replaced plastic coverings that were installed in the mid-1980s to protect stained glass window from Kansas storms.  As it aged, the plastic grew opaque, however the new coverings are tempered glass which will remain clear.

After approval by the Vatican in early March 2014, Bishop Edward Weisenburger of the Diocese of Salina dedicated St. Fidelis Church as a Minor Basilica on Saturday, June 7, 2014.

Capuchins
Since the late 19th century, the faithful and their meeting places in Ellis County, Kansas, including St. Fidelis Catholic Church, have been overseen by the Capuchin Order, a subset of the Franciscans. A three-story building beside the church is a Friary of the Capuchins, and now houses retired and aging Capuchin priests.

Notable persons
 Theodore Edgar McCarrick - laicized former cardinal and bishop of the Catholic Church.  In January 2020, it was announced that McCarrick had moved to an undisclosed location.

References

Further reading
 Cathedral Of The Plains: A History And Pictorial Guide Of St. Fidelis Church, Victoria, Kansas; 1986.
 Historic Churches of the United States; Robert C. Broderick; Wilfred Funk; 1958.
 Pioneer's Death Recalls Building Victoria Church; Ellis County News; March 4, 1948.
 Victoria, the Story of a Western Kansas Town; Fort Hays Kansas State College; 1947.
 Tall Spires on the Prairie; Kansas City Star; August 27, 1911.

External links

  St. Fidelis Catholic Church
 National Register of Historic Places nomination for St. Fidelis Catholic Church
 Historic photo of St. Fedalis Ceminery
 Victoria City Map, KDOT

Churches in Ellis County, Kansas
Churches on the National Register of Historic Places in Kansas
Roman Catholic churches completed in 1911
Churches in the Roman Catholic Diocese of Salina
Romanesque Revival church buildings in Kansas
Fidelis
National Register of Historic Places in Ellis County, Kansas
1911 establishments in Kansas
20th-century Roman Catholic church buildings in the United States